Ramón Antonio "Ramoncito" Hernández Torres (born December 22, 1960) is a Puerto Rican politician and the current mayor of Juana Díaz. Hernández is affiliated with the Popular Democratic Party (PPD) and has served as mayor since 2001. Graduated from Woodrow Wilson High School in Camden, New Jersey.

References

1960 births
Living people
Mayors of places in Puerto Rico
Popular Democratic Party (Puerto Rico) politicians
People from Juana Díaz, Puerto Rico
Politicians from Camden, New Jersey
Woodrow Wilson High School (New Jersey) alumni